The 2005 BFGoodrich Langstreckenmeisterschaft (BFGLM) season was the 28th season of the VLN.

Calendar

Race Results
Results indicate overall winners only.

Footnotes

References

External links 
 
 

2005 in German motorsport
Nürburgring Endurance Series seasons